{{Speciesbox
| image = Brockhaus and Efron Encyclopedic Dictionary b80 858-1.jpg
| image_caption = 
| taxon = Entocolax ludwigii
| authority = Voigt, 1888
| synonyms_ref = 
| synonyms = 
 Entocolax ludwigi  Voigt, 1888 
}}Entocolax ludwigii is a species of parasitic sea snail, a marine gastropod mollusk in the family Eulimidae. The species is notable for being commonly misspelled as Entocolax ludwigi'', this was the original name for this species of Caenogastropoda, the incorrect name was corrected shortly after Voigt gave the taxonomic name for this species in 1888.

Distribution
This species occurs in the following locations:

 European waters (ERMS scope)

References

External links
 To World Register of Marine Species

Eulimidae
Gastropods described in 1888